Smashes: The Best of Guardian is a compilation album released by Christian rock band Guardian. The album was released in 1999 by Myrrh Records.

The album includes the band's hits since 1993 when Jamie Rowe and Karl Ney joined the band.

Track listing
 "Dr. Jones and The Kings of Rhythm" (Bach, Palacios, Rowe) - 5:10
 "Shoeshine Johnny" (Bach, Ney, Palacios, Rowe) - 4:17
 "The Way Back Home" (Palacios) - 4:31
 "Endless Summer" (Bach) - 4:30
 "C'mon Everyone" (Palacios) - 4:59
 "This Old Man" (Palacios, Rowe, Taylor) - 2:30
 "Lead the Way" (Rowe, Taylor) - 2:44
 "Lion's Den" (Palacios, Rowe, Taylor) - 3:54
 "State of Mine" (Bach, Rowe) - 3:04
 "Psychedelic Runaway" (Palacios) - 3:25
 "Bottlerocket" (Bach, Palacios, Rowe, Taylor) - 3:44
 "Coffee Can" (Palacios, Taylor) - 3:44
 "Break Me Down" (Palacios) - 3:42
 "This Old Man (T.R.'s This Old Dub Mix)" (Palacios, Rowe, Taylor) - 4:53
 "Bottlerocket (CHR Remix)" (Bach, Palacios, Rowe, Taylor) - 3:52
 "Babble On (Acoustic Remix)" (Palacios, Rowe, Taylor) - 4:38
 "Queen Esther (Mellow Remix)" (Palacios) - 3:47
 "Bottlerocket (Dance Remix)" (Bach, Palacios, Rowe, Taylor) - 4:33

Personnel
 Jamie Rowe – vocals
 David Bach – bass guitar, background vocals
 Karl Ney – drums
 Tony Palacios – guitar, background vocals

References

External links
Album information at Guardian's webpage

Guardian (band) albums
1999 greatest hits albums